John Marshall Macdonald (9 November 1920 in Dunedin, New Zealand – 16 December 2007 in Englewood, Colorado) was a forensic psychiatrist most renowned for his theory of the Macdonald triad of sociopathic traits and his profiling of serial killers. He published approximately a dozen books in his field.

Bibliography 
The murderer and his victim (C. C. Thomas, 1961)

1920 births
2007 deaths
Forensic psychiatrists 
New Zealand psychiatrists
New Zealand Army personnel
New Zealand people of Scottish descent
20th-century New Zealand medical doctors
New Zealand emigrants to the United States